The 2021 Formula Regional Japanese Championship was a multi-event, Formula 3 open-wheel single seater motor racing championship held in Japan. The drivers competed in Formula Regional cars that conform to the FIA Formula Regional regulations for the championship. This was the second season of the championship, promoted by K2 Planet.

The season started on 26 June and concluded on 12 December. Yuga Furutani took the drivers' title ahead of Ai Miura, while his team TOM'S Youth won the teams' title and Takashi Hata earned Masters' class honors.

Teams and drivers 
All teams and drivers competed using the Dome F111/3 Regional F3 car. All teams were Japanese-registered.

Race calendar 
The first calendar for 2021 was announced on 30 October 2020. For the first time, the series was planned to be on the Formula One support bill, at the 2021 Japanese Grand Prix. After the changes in the calendar, it was to support FIA World Endurance Championship at 2021 6 Hours of Fuji instead, before that race was cancelled. The round at Sugo was moved to 9 October later on.

Championship standings

Scoring system 
Points were awarded to the top ten drivers.

Drivers' championship

Masters class

Teams' standings 
Only the best finishing driver of each team was eligible for teams' championship points.

References

External links 
 

Regional Japanese Championship
Formula Regional
Formula Regional Japanese Championship